Marianism may refer to:
 Veneration of Mary in the Catholic Church
 the sociological concept of Marianismo.